The 2004 Bavarian Cup was the seventh edition of this competition which was started in 1998. It ended with the Jahn Regensburg II winning the competition. Together with the finalist, TSV Aindling, both clubs were qualified for the DFB Cup 2004-05.

The competition is open to all senior men's football teams playing within the Bavarian football league system and the Bavarian clubs in the Regionalliga Süd (III).

Rules & History
The seven Bezirke in Bavaria each play their own cup competition which in turn used to function as a qualifying to the German Cup (DFB-Pokal). Since 1998 these seven cup-winners plus the losing finalist of the region that won the previous event advance to the newly introduced Bavarian Cup, the Toto-Pokal. The two finalists of this competition advance to the German Cup. Bavarian clubs which play in the first or second Bundesliga are not permitted to take part in the event, their reserve teams however can. The seven regional cup winners plus the finalist from last season's winners region are qualified for the first round.

Participating clubs
The following eight clubs qualified for the 2004 Bavarian Cup:

Bavarian Cup season 2003-04 
Teams qualified for the next round in bold.

Regional finals

First round

Semi-finals

Final

DFB Cup 2004-05
The two clubs, TSV Aindling and Jahn Regensburg II, who qualified through the Bavarian Cup for the DFB Cup 2004-05 both were knocked out in the first round of the national cup competition:

References

Sources
 Deutschlands Fussball in Zahlen - Die Saison 2003-04  Yearbook of German football, publisher: DSFS

External links
 Bavarian FA website  

2004
Bavarian